Dry Branch is a stream in Jefferson County, Nebraska, in the United States.

Dry Branch runs dry most of the year, hence the name.

See also
List of rivers of Nebraska

References

Rivers of Jefferson County, Nebraska
Rivers of Nebraska